Proutiella repetita is a species of rare moth of the family Notodontidae. It seems to be endemic to eastern Colombia, and is only known from fifteen specimens.

References

External links
Species page at Tree of Life project

Notodontidae of South America
Moths described in 1905